Kevin John Davies may refer to:

 Kevin John Davies, Surveyor General of Queensland in 1982–1990
 Kevin Jon Davies, British television and video director

See also
 Kevin Davies (disambiguation)